Apodachlya is a genus of water mold within the order Leptomitales.

Physical characteristics
Apodachlya are characterized by the structure of their hyphae, which are constricted into septae-like structures which enclose cellulin plugs,  preventing the loss of cytoplasm in the case of cell rupture. They reproduce asexually in the water. Zoospores encyst at the tip in a manner similar to the genus Achlya.

References

Water moulds
Water mould genera